Elizabeth Dekkers (born 6 May 2004) is an Australian  swimmer. At the 2022 Commonwealth Games, she won the gold medal in the 200 m butterfly.

Biography
Dekkers is from South Brisbane, Queensland. She was selected for the 2022 Commonwealth Games in Birmingham, where she competed in the 200m butterfly, reaching the final and winning the gold medal.

References

2004 births
Living people
Australian female swimmers
Sportswomen from Queensland
Swimmers at the 2022 Commonwealth Games
Commonwealth Games medallists in swimming
Commonwealth Games gold medallists for Australia
Medalists at the FINA World Swimming Championships (25 m)
21st-century Australian women
Medallists at the 2022 Commonwealth Games